Washington Township is a township in Plymouth County, Iowa in the United States. The township is named after George Washington.

The elevation of Washington Township is listed as 1227 feet above mean sea level.

References

Townships in Iowa